The Archbishops' Council is a part of the governance structures of the Church of England. Its headquarters are at Church House, Great Smith Street, London.

The council was created in 1999 to provide a central executive body to co-ordinate and lead the work of the church. This was a partial implementation of the recommendations of the report "Working Together as One Body" produced by Michael Turnbull (then Bishop of Durham) in 1994.

Objectives and objects 
The council describes its objectives as:
 enhancing the church's mission by:
 promoting spiritual and numerical growth,
 enabling and supporting the worshipping church and encouraging and promoting new ways of being church, and
 engaging with issues of social justice and environmental stewardship
 sustaining and advance the church's work in education, lifelong learning and discipleship;
 enabling the church to select, train and resource the right people, both ordained and lay, to carry out public ministry and encouraging lay people in their vocation to the world; and
 encouraging the maintenance and development of the inherited fabric of church buildings for worship and service to the community.

And its objects as:
 giving a clear strategic sense of direction to the national work of the Church of England, within an overall vision set by the House of Bishops and informed by an understanding of the church's opportunities, needs and resources;
 encouraging and resourcing the church in parishes and dioceses;
 promoting close collaborative working between the church's national bodies, including through the management of a number of common services (communications, human resources, IT etc.);
 supporting the archbishops with their diverse ministries and responsibilities; and engaging confidently with government and other bodies.

Legal status and membership 
The Archbishops' Council was established by the National Institutions Measure passed by the General Synod of the Church of England in 1998. It has its own legal identity and is, in addition, a charity.

The council is made up of:
 the Archbishop of Canterbury
 the Archbishop of York
 the prolocutors of the convocations of Canterbury and York
 the chairman and vice-chairman of the House of Laity of the General Synod
 two bishops elected by the House of Bishops of the General Synod
 two members of the clergy elected by the House of Clergy of the General Synod
 two lay people elected by the House of Laity
 one of the Church Estates Commissioners
 up to six other people jointly appointed by the two archbishops, with the consent of the General Synod. These appointees have a non-executive role and currently include:
 Philip Fletcher (chair, Ofwat),
 Mark Russell (chief executive, Church Army),
 Andrew Britton (former director, National Institute of Economic and Social Research),
 Mary Chapman (former chief executive, Chartered Management Institute),
 Rosalyn Murphy (priest-in-charge, St Thomas's, Blackpool),
 Rebecca Swinson (former chair, Church of England Youth Council)

The archbishops of Canterbury and York are the joint presidents of the council, but the Archbishop of Canterbury normally chairs its meetings.

The council is one of the "National Church Institutions"; the others include the Church Commissioners, the Church of England Pensions Board and the General Synod.

Committees and staff 
The work of the council is assisted by a number of committees:
 Mission and Public Affairs Council (including the Hospital Chaplaincies Council)
 Board of Education
 Committee for Minority Ethnic Anglican Concerns
 Council for Christian Unity
 Central Council for the Care of Churches
 Committees of the Ministry Division
 Committee for Ministry of and among Deaf and Disabled People
 Deployment, Recruitment and Conditions of Service Committee
 Theological Education and Training Committee
 Vocation, Recruitment and Selection Committee
 Finance Committee
 Audit Committee

In 2006, the council employed about 250 staff. The senior posts include:
 Secretary-General to the Council and the General Synod
 Chief Education Officer
 Director of Mission & Public Affairs
 Head of Cathedral and Church Buildings
 Director of Ministry
 Director of Human Resources
 Head of Legal Office and Chief Legal Adviser to the General Synod
 Clerk to the Synod and Director of Central Secretariat

Finances 
The members of the council are also members and directors of the Central Board of Finance of the Church of England. Technically, the board of finance is a separate legal entity, however all major decisions are taken by members of the council in their capacity as the directors of the Board.

In 2006, the council had a budget of approximately £61 million, principally derived from the Church Commissioners (about £32 million) and contributions from each of the dioceses (£24.5 million).

Spending in that year included grants to the dioceses (£31 million), training clergy (both funding for colleges and allowances for individuals in residential training - £10 million), grants to organisation such as Churches Together, the Church Urban Fund and the World Council of Churches (£2.2 million), and housing assistance for retired clergy (£2.8 million).

Notable members 

 William Fittall, secretary-general from 2002 to 2015
 Philip Fletcher, 2007 to 2016
 David Lammy, 1999 to 2002
William Nye, secretary-general from 2015-present
 Jayne Ozanne, 1999 to 2004
 Mark Russell, CEO of the Church Army, 2005 to 2011 and since 2015
 Glyn Webster, present

References

External links 
 Official website

Anglican organizations established in the 20th century
Christian organizations established in 1999
Church of England ecclesiastical polity
Church of England societies and organisations
Organisations based in the City of Westminster
Religion in the City of Westminster
1999 establishments in the United Kingdom